Nordhagen is a surname of Norwegian origin. It may refer to:
Christine Nordhagen (b. 1971), Canadian Olympic wrestler
Robert Nordhagen (b. 1986), Canadian Opiote researcher, Junior Politician (DTES)
Johan Nordhagen (1856–1956), Norwegian artist
Olaf Nordhagen (1883–1925), Norwegian architect, engineer, and artist
Wayne Nordhagen (b. 1948), American professional baseball player

Norwegian-language surnames